The Military Police is the branch within the Austrian Armed Forces tasked with law enforcement and the protection of the forces, military events and Austrian Armed Forces property.
The increasing number of international operations with the participation of Austrian soldiers and new threat scenarios hugely expand the spectrum of tasks.

Military Police Command 
The Austrian MP Command, located in Vienna, consists of the following elements
Military Police HQ
Fundamentals Division
Training Division
Signal platoon
Personal protection
3 MP Companies
MP militia

MP Companies / Locations 
One MP HQ in Vienna, one in Graz, one in Salzburg, one in Klagenfurt and one in St.Pölten, each composed of the following elements
HQ element
Special tasks
Supply element
3 MP platoons

Tasks 
Additionally to its traditional domestic tasks, the formation now also fulfills tasks in international operations. In Austria the Military Police is only tasked with internal Armed Forces matters.  Abroad, the Military Police is tasked with extensive assignments. It closes the security gap between a conflict that has ended and a functioning society.
A large number of experienced specialists and modern equipment are required to meet these demanding tasks.

National tasks 
Check routines and security checks
Security duty
Traffic control
Personal Protection
Force Protection
Law enforcement
Inquiries

International tasks 
Until national police units have been formed, the Military Police is responsible for all tasks which have to be fulfilled by law-enforcement agencies. These tasks are highly diverse and in every field require the employment of specialists with modern equipment. 
Taking down traffic accidents
Crime scene investigation
Fingerprinting and photographing
Interrogations
Searches/investigations/support in interventions
Detention of dangerous criminals
Crowd and riot control
Operation of detention facilities
Interventions (Special weapons and tactics - SWAT)
Personal Protection
Defence against terrorism

Requirements 
Austrian citizenship
Completed basic national service in the Austrian Armed Forces
No previous criminal or disciplinary convictions
Good vision
Military driver's license, at least B1
Security clearance
Good physical fitness
Aptitude rating above 5 (= result of the induction process)
Minimum height: Men: 168; Women: 163 cm

Selection 
Professional and militia officers and non-commissioned officers take precedence. (International) experience in command functions of combat units is an advantage. 
The MP selection procedure can, however, already be undergone after the corporals' course. It is not before the second semester of the NCO training course, though, that the actual training to become a member of the Military Police begins. 
During the MP selection procedure, the candidates' psychological robustness is especially tested, besides general fitness and the ability to work in a team.

Training 
Before admission to the MP selection course, every candidate has successfully to complete basic training 1, 2 and 3 as well as the corporals' course. Having passed the selection course, the candidate is admitted to the first semester of the NCO training course at the NCO Academy. During the second semester the candidate starts MP basic training at the Training Division of the Military Police Command in Vienna, after the successful completion of which s/he becomes a member of the MP.

Basic MP training 
Overpowering a suspect
Legal provisions
Traffic control
Check routines
Inquiry fundamentals
Law enforcement
Weapons Training
Military hand-to-hand combat
Medical service
Procedures in buildings
Various military driver's licenses
Radio operator training
CRC training (duty during demonstrations)
Search for persons
Employment in the international MP service

Special training 
Basic MP training is followed by special MP training, in which MP members are trained in the task areas they are earmarked for.

Member of a SWAT team
Inquiry service
Close Protection
Hand-to-hand combat instructor
Live firing instructor
Driving instructor
Dog handler
SWAT element
Training to become an operation leader
Forensic special investigation
MP snipers

Parts of the training take place in cooperation with the Federal Ministry of the Interior, the Federal Ministry of Justice and the HQ Commandos.

Missions 
The Austrian MP participates in the current mission of the Austrian Armed Forces
in Bosnia and Herzegovina &
in the Kosovo.
The MP-Command also holds a unit in readiness so that they can accomplish emerging missions worldwide at any time. Such missions could be Close-Protection missions or the evacuation EU citizens.

Weapons 
 FN P90
 Glock 17 (P.80- Standard Issue)
 Glock 26 (P26)
 Steyr AUG (StG.77)
 Steyr TMP
 Taser

References 

TRUPPENDIENST Nr. 307; 1/2009 - Die Militärstreife im ÖBH2010; Das Kommado Militärtsreife & Militärpolizei
TRUPPENDIENST Nr. 306; 6/2008 - Das Close Protection Team im Kosovo
SOLDIERS RAIDS Nr. 157; Policia Militar De Austria
EINSATZ Magazin für Sicherheit und Wirtschaft 3.JG.; 2/2008 - Ein neuer Spezialverband des Heeres
MILIZinfo März 1/2007 - Militärstreife/MP
MILIZinfo Juni 2/2009 - Militärstreife & Militärpolizei
NEWS 30/09 - BODYGUARDS im Schatten der Macht
Öffentliche SICHERHEIT 11-12/08; Rückkehr der flammenden Granate
POLIZEITUNG 20.Jhg. Nr. 82; 4/2008 - Bundesheer läßt die flammende Granate der Gendarmerie "weiterleben"
derStandard 11.08.2009; Wenn die Armee zur Polizei wird
derStandard 09.08.2009; Drogen, Deserteure und Hochgeschwindigkeits-Flucht

External links 
Bundesheer - Kommando Militärstreife und Militärpolizei (German)

Military of Austria
Military provosts of Austria